Patrick Nagel (born 6 August 1990) is a German footballer who plays as a defender for PSV Union Neumünster.

References

External links
 

1990 births
Living people
German footballers
Association football defenders
Holstein Kiel players
VfR Neumünster players
3. Liga players
Regionalliga players
Holstein Kiel II players
Place of birth missing (living people)